Malacky Air Base  is a military airport located near Malacky, a town in the Bratislava Region of Slovakia.

See also
 Slovak Air Force
 List of airports in Slovakia

References

External links
 
 Malacky Air Base / Kuchyna Bombing Range at GlobalSecurity.org
 Malacky Air Base - LZMC - aircraft photos

Slovak airbases
Buildings and structures in Bratislava Region